The Al Bander report refers to a political conspiracy by government officials in Bahrain to foment sectarian strife and marginalize the majority Shia community in the country. The conspiracy was led and financed by Ahmed bin Ateyatalla Al Khalifa, Minister of Cabinet Affairs and head of the Civil Informatics Organization and member of the Al Khalifa royal family. The allegations were revealed in September 2006, in a 240-page document produced by the Gulf Centre for Democratic Development, and authored by Salah Al Bandar, an adviser to the Cabinet Affairs Ministry. Following the distribution of the report, Bahraini police forcibly deported Al Bandar to the United Kingdom, where he holds citizenship.

According to Al Bander, the Minister in Bahrain paid five main operatives a total of more than $2.7 million to run:
 a secret intelligence cell spying on Shi’as
 ‘GONGOs’ – government operated bogus NGOs like the ‘Bahraini Jurists Society’ and the ‘Bahrain Human Rights Watch Society’
 internet forums and websites that foment sectarian hatred
 subsidisation of ‘new converts’ from Shia Islam to Sunnism
 payments for election rigging

Individuals accused in the Bandargate report

See also
Human rights in Bahrain
Ahmed Al-Fateh

References
 300 protesters in Bahrain demand investigation into alleged conspiracy to rig elections, International Herald Tribune, 17 November 2006
 Report Cites Bid by Sunnis in Bahrain to Rig Elections, The New York Times, 2 October 2006
 Al-Bandar Ejection Exposes Bahrain Split, The Washington Post, 2 October 2006
 Allegations of treason, vote-rigging warn of sectarian strife ahead of Bahrain elections, International Herald Tribune, 2 October 2006
 « Bandargate » et tensions confessionnelles, Alain Gresh, Le Monde diplomatique, 19 October 2006
 Al Bander-Gate: A Political Scandal In Bahrain, Bahrain Center for Human Rights, September 2006
 Documents related to Bandargate, Bahrain Center for Human Rights
 BandarGate, Lord Eric Avebury, 5 October 2006
 Banning Publication of News or Information Related to the “Bandar-Gate” Scandal, Bahrain Center for Human Rights, 6 October 2006
 “Bandar-Gate” and the Dangerous Role Played by Some Human Rights Societies and its Relation to the secret organization, Statement by Bahraini Human Rights Activists, 10 October 2006
 Activists and journalist receive threats for highlighting Bandargate scandal, Bahrain Center for Human Rights, 12 October 2006
 Bahrain: Must be election season, Toby Jones, 12 October 2006
 Concern over the lack of an official response to Al Bandergate, Bahrain Center for Human Rights, 13 October 2006
 Petition From A Hundred Prominent Figures And Activists To The King Of Bahrain regarding Bandargate scandal, 13 October 2006
 Documentary video: Political Naturalization in Bahrain
 Mahmood's Den Bandargate Archive
 Bandargate Blog
 BANDARGATE!, Gulf Daily News, 24 September 2006
 BANDARGATE: The unanswered questions, Gulf Daily News, 27 September 2006
 Probe Call, Gulf Daily News, 27 September 2006
 MPs call for Al Bandar probe, Gulf Daily News, 27 September 2006
 Secret offer to run society is alleged, Gulf Daily News, 29 September 2006
 Activists charting action plan, Gulf Daily News, 29 September 2006
 High Court issues Bandar Press gag, Gulf Daily News, 5 October 2006
 Societies call to lift Press gag, Gulf Daily News, 9 October 2006
 Video: Press conference of Salah Al Bandar the UK House of Lords (Parts: 1, 2, 3)
 Video: Discussion with Salah Al Bandar on Kawthar TV (Parts: 1, 2, 3)

Anti-Shi'ism
Political history of Bahrain
Politics of Bahrain
Human rights abuses in Bahrain
Political scandals
2006 in Bahrain
2006 documents